Orbital artery may refer to:

 Infraorbital artery
 Supraorbital artery
 Zygomatico-orbital artery